Project SHAD, an acronym for Shipboard Hazard and Defense, was part of a larger effort called Project 112, which was conducted during the 1960s. Project SHAD encompassed tests designed to identify U.S. warships' vulnerabilities to attacks with chemical agents or biological warfare agents and to develop procedures to respond to such attacks while maintaining a war-fighting capability.

History

Project SHAD was part of a larger effort by the Department of Defense called Project 112.  Project 112 was a chemical and biological weapons research, development, and testing project conducted by the United States Department of Defense and CIA handled by the Deseret Test Center and United States Army Chemical Materials Agency from 1962 to 1973. The project started under John F. Kennedy's administration, and was authorized by his Secretary of Defense Robert McNamara, as part of a total review of the US military. The name of the project refers to its number in the 150 review process.

Mission
The Shipboard Hazard and Defense Project (SHAD) was a series of tests conducted by the U.S. Department of Defense during the 1960s to determine how well service members aboard military ships could detect and respond to chemical and biological attacks. Dee Dodson Morris of the Army Chemical Corps who coordinated the ongoing investigation, says, "The SHAD tests were intended to show how vulnerable Navy ships were to chemical or biological warfare agents. The objective was to learn how chemical or biological warfare agents would disperse throughout a ship, and to use that information to develop procedures to protect crewmembers and decontaminate ships."  DoD investigators note that over a hundred tests were planned but the lack of test results may indicate that many tests were never actually executed.  134 tests were planned initially, but reportedly, only 46 tests were actually completed.

Declassification
Public Law 107–314 required the identification and release of not only Project 112 information to the United States Veterans Administration, but also that of any other projects or tests where a veteran might have been exposed to a chemical or biological warfare agent, and directed the secretary of defense to work with veterans and veterans service organizations to identify the other projects or tests conducted by the Department of Defense that may have exposed members of the Armed Forces to chemical or biological agents. In 2000, the Department of Defense began the process of declassifying records about the project.  According to the U.S. Department of Veteran Affairs, approximately 6,000 U.S. Service members were believed to be involved in conducting the tests.  In 2002, the Department of Defense began publishing a list of fact sheets for each of the tests.

Identification
Although many of the roughly 5,500 veterans who took part were aware of the tests, some were involved without their knowledge. Certain issues surrounding the test program were not resolved by the passage of the law and the Department of Defense was accused of continuing to withhold documents on Cold War chemical and biological weapons tests that used unsuspecting veterans as "human samplers" after reporting to Congress it had released all medically relevant information. A Government Accounting Office May 2004 report, Chemical and Biological Defense: DOD Needs to Continue to Collect and Provide Information on Tests and Potentially Exposed Personnel indicates that almost all participants who were identified from Project 112 — 94 percent — were from ship-based tests of Project SHAD that comprised only about one-third of the total number of tests conducted.

Medical studies
Jack Alderson, a retired Navy officer who commanded the Army tugboats, told CBS News that he believes the Pentagon used him and other service members to test weapons, and that those tests included agents, vaccines, and decontamination products which have led to serious medical problems, including cancer. Secrecy agreements can now be ignored by veterans in order to pursue healthcare concerns within the Department of Veterans Affairs.  The V.A. has offered screening programs for veterans who believe they were involved in DoD sponsored tests during their service.  The Institute of Medicine of the National Academies has commissioned studies of Project SHAD participants. The first, Long-Term Health Effects of Participation in Project SHAD (Shipboard Hazard and Defense), was released in 2007, and found "no clear evidence that specific long-term health effects are associated with participation in Project SHAD."  The second, Shipboard Hazard and Defense II (SHAD II), by the IoM's Medical Follow-up Agency (MFUA), began in 2012, and, as of April 2014, was ongoing.

Locations of SHAD tests 
from SHAD Fact Sheets
Pacific Ocean
Pacific Ocean off San Diego, CA
Pacific Ocean, from San Diego, CA to Balboa, Panama
Ft. Sherman, Panama Canal Zone
Eniwetok Atoll, Marshall Islands
Baker Island
Island of Hawaii
Pacific Ocean near the Island of Oahu, Hawaii
Pacific Ocean, west of Oahu, Hawaii
Pacific Ocean southwest of Oahu, HI
Oahu, HI and surrounding waters
Pacific Ocean, off Oahu, HI & surrounding water & airspace
Pacific Ocean near Johnston Island
Eglin Air Force Base, Florida
Atlantic Ocean off Newfoundland, Canada

Ships and air units involved

Ships 
 USS Berkeley (DDG-15)
 USS Carbonero (SS-337)
 USS Carpenter (DD-825)
 USS Fechteler (DD-870)
 USS Fort Snelling (LSD-30)
 USS George Eastman (YAG-39)
 USS Granville S. Hall (YAG-40)
 USS Herbert J. Thomas (DD-833)
 USS Hoel (DDG-13)
 USS Moctobi (ATF-105)
 USS Navarro (APA-215)
 USS Okanogan (APA-220)
 USS Power (DD-839)
 USNS Samuel Phillips Lee (T-AGS 31)
 USNS Silas Bent (T-AGS-26)
 USS Tioga County (LST-1158)
 USS Tiru (SS-416)
 USS Wexford County (LST-1168)
 US Navy Lighter Barge (YFN-811)
 US Army Large Tug LT-2080
 US Army Large Tug LT-2081
 US Army Large Tug LT-2085
 US Army Large Tug LT-2086
 US Army Large Tug LT-2087
 US Army Large Tug LT-2088

Air units 
 Meteorological Research Service (contractor) C-47
 US Navy Airborne Early Warning Barrier Squadron Pacific (AEWBarRonpac) Lockheed WV-2 / EC-121 Warning Star
 US Navy Patrol Squadron Four (VP-4) (PATRON Four), Fleet Air Wing Four (Lockheed P-2 Neptune)
 US Navy Patrol Squadron Six (VP-6) (PATRON SIX), Fleet Air Wing Two (Lockheed P-2 Neptune)
 US Navy VU-1 Utility Squadron One, re-designated VC-1 Composite Squadron One on July 1, 1965. (Douglas A-4 Skyhawk)
 USMC Marine Aircraft Group 13, 1st Marine Aircraft Wing, 1st Marine Expeditionary Brigade. McDonnell Douglas F-4 Phantom II, A-4 (Skyhawk), Sikorsky H-34 Seahorse
 USMC Marine Medium Helicopter Squadron 161 (HMM 161), Marine Aircraft Group 16 (MAG-16), 3rd Marine Aircraft Wing (3rd MAW) Sikorsky H-34 Seahorse
 US Air Force 4533rd Tactical Test Squadron, US Air Force 33rd Tactical Fighter Wing (F-4E Phantom II)

See also
 Human experimentation in the United States
 Operation Dew
 Operation LAC
 Operation Whitecoat
 Project 112
 San Jose Project

Notes

References

 United States. Congress. Senate. Committee on Armed Services. Subcommittee on Personnel, "The Department of Defense's inquiry into Project 112/Shipboard Hazard and Defense (SHAD) tests: hearing before the Subcommittee on Personnel of the Committee on Armed Services, United States Senate, One Hundred Seventh Congress, second session, October 10, 2002," United States Congress, S. hrg. 107–810 (2003), 1–39.
 United States. Congress. House. Report, "Health care for veterans of Project 112/Project SHAD Act of 2003: report (to accompany H.R. 2433)," United States Congress, Report/108th Congress, 1st session, House of Representatives, 108–213, 1–19.
 United States. Congress. House. Committee on Veterans' Affairs. Subcommittee on Health, "Military operations aspects of SHAD and Project 112: hearing before the Subcommittee on Health of the Committee on Veterans' Affairs, House of Representatives, One Hundred Seventh Congress, second session, October 9, 2002", 107th Congress, 2nd session, 107–43, 1–19.
 "Project Shipboard Hazard and Defense (SHAD)" from

External links 
 Columbia Journalism Review, Laurels November/December 2000
 Vietnam Veterans of America - The Veteran  December2000/January 2001
 http://archive.vva.org/TheVeteran/2002_01/hazardous.htm
 Project SHAD at the United States Department of Veterans Affairs, includes pocket guides and Q&A
 Vietnam Veterans of America
 GAO
 The Chemical-Biological Warfare Exposures Site, Official Web site of Force Health Protection & Readiness Policy & Programs
 Project 112/SHAD - Shipboard Hazard and Defense, Official Web site of Force Health Protection & Readiness Policy & Programs

Declassified documents
OSD & Joint Staff FOIA Requester Service Center
 PROJECT SHAD -- AUTUMN GOLD, May 1964
 PROJECT SHAD -- BIG JACK
 PROJECT SHAD -- NIGHT TRAIN, December 1964

Biological warfare
Bioethics
Military projects of the United States
United States Department of Defense
Human subject research in the United States